Gaotang (高唐县) is a county of Liaocheng, Shandong, People's Republic of China (PRC).

Gāotáng (高塘 unless otherwise noted) may also refer to the following locations in the PRC:

 Gaotang, Huoqiu County, town in Anhui
 Gaotang, Fujian (高唐镇), town in Jiangle County
 Gaotang, Guangdong (高堂镇), town in Raoping County
 Gaotang, Shaanxi, town in Hua County
 Gaotang Township, Anhui, in Dingyuan County
 Gaotang Township, Jiangxi, in De'an County
 Gaotang Township, Hunan, in Hengdong County